National Origins Formula is an umbrella term for a series of qualitative immigration quotas in America used from 1921 to 1965, which restricted immigration from the Eastern Hemisphere on the basis of national origin. These restrictions included legislation and federal acts. Since there is no one formula that can account for each law or restriction across the decades, as the scale, variables, and demographic characteristics change per law, the concept of National Origins Formula is best described as a collection of quantitative data considerations in immigration and migration laws in the United States.

History 
Temporary measures establishing quota limits per country based on the makeup of the foreign-born population residing in the U.S. were introduced in 1921 (Emergency Quota Act) and 1924 (Immigration Act of 1924); these were replaced by a permanent quota system based on each nationality's share of the total U.S. population as of 1920, which took effect on July 1, 1929 and governed American immigration law until December 1, 1965 (when the Immigration and Nationality Act of 1965 abolished it). The National Origins Formula aimed to preserve the existing ethnic proportions of the population as calculated according to data from the 1920 Census of Population.

The 1921 Emergency Quota Act restricted immigration to 3% of foreign-born persons of each nationality that resided in the United States in 1910.

The Immigration Act of 1924, also called the National Origins Act, provided that for three years the formula would change from 3% to 2% and the basis for the calculation would be the census of 1890 instead of that of 1910. After June 30, 1927, total immigration from all countries will be limited to 150,000, with allocations by country based upon national origins of inhabitants according to the census of 1920. The quota system applied only to non-Asian immigrants. It aimed to reduce the overall number of unskilled immigrants, to allow families to re-unite, and to prevent immigration from changing the ethnic distribution of the population. The 1924 Act also included the Asian Exclusion Act, which limited immigration to persons eligible for naturalization. 
As a result, East Asians and South Asians were effectively banned from immigrating. Africans were also subjected to severe restrictions. Immigration from North and South America was not restricted.

National origins computation 

Under the Immigration Act of 1924, the Bureau of the Census and Department of Commerce were tasked with estimating the National Origins of the White Population of the United States in 1920 in numbers, then calculating the percentage share each nationality made up as a fraction of the total. The National Origins Formula derived quotas by calculating the equivalent proportion of each nationality out of a total pool of 150,000 annual quota immigrants. This formula was used until the Immigration and Nationality Act of 1952 adopted a simplified formula limiting each country to a quota of one-sixth of one percent of that nationality's 1920 population count, with a minimum quota of 100.

The formula required classification of the national origins by birth or ancestry of all White Americans, except those having origins in the nonquota countries of the Western Hemisphere. The total White American population in 1920 was estimated at 94,820,915. Whites with origins in the Western Hemisphere were estimated at 5,314,357—approximately 4,085,000 from Canada and Newfoundland; 1,126,000 from Mexico; 66,000 from the West Indies; and 37,000 from Central and South America. This left the total relevant population for the quota calculation formula at 89,506,558.

To compute the proportions of blood each national origin had contributed to the American population as of 1920, demographers divided the population into four more easily classifiable groups by generation. The process was complicated due to the more limited set of data recorded in the country's earlier decades compared to the increasingly detailed information published in later versions of the United States census. 49,182,158 were deemed to be of immigrant stock, accounting for 55% of the total, subdivided into three categories. The easiest to classify were the two most recently-arrived generations of immigrants, accounting for 1/3 of the 1920 total:
 13.5% of the total: 12,071,282 immigrants classified by land of foreign-birth recorded in the 1920 Census 
 19.7% of the total: 17,620,676 children of immigrants classified by land of foreign-birth, foreign parentage, or foreign mother tongue in the 1920 or 1910 Census 
 21.8% of the total: 19,490,200 grandchildren and later generations of immigrants classified based on past records of immigration and naturalization: persons of foreign-birth, parentage, or mother tongue in the Census counts of 1920 and 1910; foreign-birth or parentage in 1900 and 1890; foreign-born in the Census counts of 1850-1880; and records of immigrants admitted 1820-1840.
 45.0% of the total: 40,324,400 descendants of colonial stock, apportioned into the same ethnic proportional makeup as the population enumerated in the 1790 Census

Colonial stock estimation 
Calculation of the colonial stock proved challenging, and delayed formula implementation from 1927 to 1929. The 1790 Census recorded a total of 3,172,444 European Americans; their 40,324,400 colonial stock descendants in 1920 were allocated into national origin blocs proportional to the ratio of nationalities that had existed in the 1790 population, adjusted to account for natural growth as of 1920.

The national origins of the colonial stock had to be estimated by careful analysis of the limited information recorded in the first U.S. Census: scholarly classification of the approximately 30,000 unique names of White heads of families recorded in the 1790 Census into their respective national stocks.

In 1924, the only Census Bureau estimate of colonial stock makeup had been published more than a decade prior in 1909 report A Century of Population Growth, which put the 1790 population at 82.1% English (incl. Welsh), 7.0% Scotch, 1.9% Irish, 2.5% Dutch, 0.6% French and 5.6% German. When CPG was produced in 1909, the concept of independent Ireland did not even exist. CPG made no attempt to further classify its estimated 1.9% Irish population to distinguish Celtic Irish Catholics of Gaelic Ireland, who in 1922 formed the independent Irish Free State, from the Scotch-Irish descendants of Ulster Scots and Anglo-Irish of the Plantation of Ulster, which became Northern Ireland and remained part of the United Kingdom. Unlike in 1909, the undercount of other colonial stock populations like German Americans and Irish Americans would now have real contemporary policy consequences. In 1927, proposed immigration quotas based on CPG figures were rejected by the President's Committee chaired by the Secretaries of State, Commerce, and Labor, with the President reporting to Congress "the statistical and historical information available raises grave doubts as to the whole value of these computations as the basis for the purposes intended."

Among further criticisms of A Century of Population Growth figures:
 CPG failed to account for Anglicisation of names, assuming any surname that could be English was actually English
 CPG failed to consider first names even when obviously foreign, assuming anyone with a surname that could be English was actually English
 CPG failed to consider regional variation in ethnic settlement e.g. surname Root could be assumed English in Vermont (less than 1% German), but more commonly a variant of German Roth in states with large German American populations like populous Pennsylvania (home to more Germans than the entire population of Vermont)
 CPG started by classifying all names as Scotch, Irish, Dutch, French, German, Hebrew, or other. All remaining names which could not be classed with one of the 6 other listed nationalities, nor identified by the Census clerk as too exotic to be English, were assumed to be English
 CPG classification was an unscientific process by Census clerks with no training in history, genealogy, or linguistics, nor were scholars in those fields consulted
 CPG estimates were produced by a linear process with no checks on potential errors nor opportunity for peer review or scholarly revision once an individual clerk had assigned a name to a nationality

Concluding that CPG "had not been accepted by scholars as better than a first approximation of the truth", the Census Bureau commissioned a more accurate academic analysis, collaborating with the American Council of Learned Societies, and later published in the journal of the American Historical Association. The revised figures of the Report of the Committee on Linguistic and National Stocks in the Population of the United States put the 1790 population at 60.1% English (incl. Welsh), 8.1% Scotch, 5.9% Scotch Irish (Ulster), 3.6% Irish (Free State), 8.6% German, 3.1% Dutch, 2.3% French, 0.7% Swedish (incl. Finnish), 0.8% Spanish, and 6.8% unassigned, later distributed to fit the reshaped political geography of 1920s Europe. The proportional national divisions of European Americans of colonial stock in 1790 was applied to their descendent population of 1920 to complete computations in time for the national origins formula quotas to take effect in 1929.

White Americans by national origin in 1920 
Note the National Origins Formula was a unique computation (not comparable with e.g. self-reported ancestries in the decennial U.S. Census or annual American Community Survey), which sought to determine the degree of 'blood' each national origin had contributed to the total White American population (in scientific terms, the genetic contribution of each nation), acknowledging the reality of centuries of intermarriage among European Americans of different ethnicities from all corners of Europe since the earliest settlements of the New World. The numbers do not purport to represent 'pure' discrete individuals of monoethnic backgrounds. Rather the figures reflect how the population would have naturally grown if each succeeding generation from the 1790 colonial stock had only mated endogamously among their own co-ethnics in the subsequent 130 years–thus estimating the diffusion of 'blood' among White Americans as a collective whole–for in reality exogamy was common, many White Americans being of mixed European ancestries (measuring 'blood' in modern parlance akin to DNA test results measuring an individual's ancestral makeup, applied to a population.)

Quota calculation formula 
The national origins formula prescribed by the Immigration Act of 1924, effective 1929, capped total annual quota immigration from outside the Western Hemisphere at 150,000. The quota for each country was to be computed as a fraction of 150,000 in a ratio proportional to the number of U.S. inhabitants of each national origin as a share of total inhabitants in 1920, with a minimum quota of 100. Due to the minimum rounding up the quotas for all countries that would not have otherwise reached 100, in practice the annual global quota total was slightly more than 150,000 (in 1930 totaling 153,714), but the formula calculation still used the fixed number 150,000.

For example, the number of U.S. inhabitants in 1920 who were derived from the United Kingdom was fixed at 39,216,333 so the formula . The formula could thus be solved for q as: 
 .
Or the formula could be solved to compute the quota by converting the fraction for the national origin into decimal form, then multiplying to take the equivalent percentage share of 150,000: 
 .

The table below lists the number of U.S. inhabitants of each national origin in 1920, and their fractional share of the total quota population expressed in percentage form to three decimal points.

 .
 

Under the Immigration and Nationality Act of 1965, quotas were temporarily retained, but all unused quota spots each year were pooled and made available to other countries effective December 1, 1965. The National Origins Formula fully ended on July 1, 1968, replaced by simple broad numerical limitations of 120,000 from the Western Hemisphere and 170,000 from the Eastern Hemisphere, with no more than 20,000 from any one country, limits in place until the Immigration Act of 1990.

Quotas by country under successive laws 
Listed below are historical quotas on immigration from the Eastern Hemisphere, by country, as applied in given fiscal years ending June 30, calculated according to successive immigration laws and revisions from the Emergency Quota Act of 1921 to the final quota year of 1965. The 1922 and 1925 systems based on dated census records of the foreign-born population were intended as temporary measures; the full National Origins Formula based on the 1920 Census of the U.S. population took effect on July 1, 1929.

Relaxation and abolition
The Immigration and Nationality Act of 1952 retained but relaxed the National Origins Formula. It modified the ratios to be based on the 1920 census and eliminated racial restrictions, but retained restrictions by national origin. President Harry Truman vetoed it because of its continued use of national quotas, but the  Act was passed over his veto. The quotas were in addition to 600,000 refugees admitted from Europe after World War II.

The National Origins Formula was abolished by the Immigration and Nationality Act of 1965, which marked a significant change in American immigration policy. It replaced the system with two quotas for the Western and Eastern hemispheres.

See also
 Dillingham Commission
 Immigration policy

Notes

Further reading 

 Michael Lemay and Elliott Robert Barkan, eds., U.S. Immigration and Naturalization Laws and Issues: A Documentary History Greenwood Press, 1999
 John Lescott-Leszczynski, The History of U.S. Ethnic Policy and Its Impact on European Ethnics Westview Press, 1984

Anti-Asian sentiment in the United States
History of immigration to the United States
Immigration to the United States
United States federal immigration and nationality legislation